Hubbs House is Queen Anne style built in 1893 at 4th and Golconda Streets in Kingman, Arizona. 
The house has been on the National Register of Historic Places since 1978.  Its historic status was reviewed as part of a 1985 study of 63 historic resources in Kingman that led to many others being listed.

The home today is owned by the City of Kingman and is used by Head Start.

Description and construction
The house is an early adobe construction, made of adobe with clapboard siding. 
Harvey Hubbs most likely designed the home, John Mulligan & William Aitken were the contractors.

Hubbs family
Harvey Hubbs was on the way back from Texas where he had driven cattle from his home in Tulare County, California. He stopped in Kingman for the night and his horse either disappeared or was stolen along with all of his belongings. Forced to stay, he got a job being a teamster for the mines. He met Johanna Wilkinson, who with her sister, Francis, had set up tents to feed the miners and provide a place for them to sleep. After Harvey and Johanna married in 1887, they constructed Kingman's first hotel, the Hubbs House. It caught fire nine times and burned down three times including the Kingman Fire of 1898. Each time they rebuilt the hotel. The Hubbs House was later sold and with a partner, Harvey then built the Brunswick and Beale Hotels which still stand in Kingman on the site where Johanna first erected her tents. Harvey later served as Mohave County Sheriff and as a county commissioner and treasurer. He co-owned the Mohave Miner newspaper and helped bring about Kingman's first water system. His home was the first home in Kingman built in the Queen Ann style and was the first home in Kingman to have running water.

References

Houses on the National Register of Historic Places in Arizona
Houses in Kingman, Arizona
National Register of Historic Places in Kingman, Arizona